Whitehills is an area of the Scottish new town East Kilbride, in South Lanarkshire. It is a residential area in the south-east of the town, adjacent to Greenhills. This area is also known fully as High Whitehills. It houses the Ballerup Recreational football pitches and the now closed "Inn on the Stroud" pub and restaurant which is due to become a Dominos. It is also the site of the now derelict St. Andrews High School which now has become the Alistair McCoist Complex.

Whitehills has a population of 1100 people according to the 2011 Census.

Areas of East Kilbride